Elenilson da Silva (born 24 January 1972 in Jardim) is a retired long-distance runner from Brazil. He is best known for winning the gold medal in the men's 10.000 metres at the 1999 Pan American Games in Winnipeg, Manitoba, Canada.

Personal Bests
3,000 m — 8:01.62 (Rio de Janeiro, 2003)
5,000 m — 14:30.61 (Fortaleza, 2007)
10,000 m — 28:13.69 (Montréal, 2000)
Marathon — 2:12:14 (Berlin, 2001)

References
 

1972 births
Living people
Brazilian male long-distance runners
Athletes (track and field) at the 1999 Pan American Games
Sportspeople from Mato Grosso do Sul
Pan American Games gold medalists for Brazil
Pan American Games silver medalists for Brazil
Pan American Games medalists in athletics (track and field)
Medalists at the 1999 Pan American Games
20th-century Brazilian people
21st-century Brazilian people